Peshawar is a town in the Barg-i Matal District of Nuristan Province, Afghanistan, located at an altitude of 2,634 metres (8,644 feet). It is located close to the Durand Line border with Khyber Pakhtunkhwa, Pakistan.

References

Populated places in Nuristan Province